Tinel's sign (also Hoffmann-Tinel sign) is a way to detect irritated nerves. It is performed by lightly tapping (percussing) over the nerve to elicit a sensation of tingling or "pins and needles" in the distribution of the nerve. Percussion is usually performed moving distal to proximal. It is named after Jules Tinel.

It is a potential sign of carpal tunnel syndrome, cubital tunnel syndrome, anterior tarsal tunnel syndrome and symptomatic neuroma.

History 
Tinel's sign takes its name from French neurologist Jules Tinel (1879–1952), who wrote about it in a journal article published in October 1915. German neurologist Paul Hoffmann independently also published an article on the sign six months earlier, in March 1915. Previously, in 1909, Trotter and Davies published their findings that sensations elicited distal to the point of nerve resection are referred to the area or point of nerve resection; however they "failed to comment on the clinical relevance of their observation."

See also
 Hoffmann's sign
 Phalen maneuver

References

External links 
 

Neurology procedures
Musculoskeletal examination